Laxiwa (Mandarin: 拉西瓦镇) is a town in Guide County, Hainan Tibetan Autonomous Prefecture, Qinghai, China. In 2010, Laxiwa had a total population of 7,591: 4,261 males and 3,330 females: 1,485 aged under 14, 5,747 aged between 15 and 65 and 359 aged over 65.

References 

Township-level divisions of Qinghai
Guide County